Gonzalo Díaz (born 15 June 1996) is an Argentine professional footballer who plays as a midfielder.

Career
Díaz started off his senior career with Los Andes. He was an unused substitute for a Primera B Nacional fixture with Estudiantes on 26 November 2017, before appearing for his professional debut on 10 December versus Nueva Chicago as they drew 2–2 at the Estadio Eduardo Gallardón. Further appearances followed in the 2017–18 season against San Martín and Instituto.

Career statistics
.

References

External links

1996 births
Living people
Footballers from Buenos Aires
Argentine footballers
Association football midfielders
Primera Nacional players
Club Atlético Los Andes footballers